The Samaritan vocalization (or Samaritan pointing, Samaritan niqqud) is a system of diacritics used with the Samaritan script to indicate vowel quality and gemination which reflects Samaritan Hebrew. It is used by the Samaritans to provide guidance on the pronunciation of the consonantal text of the Samaritan Pentateuch and Samaritan prayer books. The Samaritan vocalization is estimated to have been invented around the 10th centuryCE. Variation exists within the system between different manuscripts.

Description

See also 
 Samaritan (Unicode block)

References 

Language of the Hebrew Bible
Hebrew alphabet